The 2014–15 Turkish Cup is the 53rd season of the Turkish Cup. Ziraat Bankası is the sponsor of the tournament, thus the sponsored name is Ziraat Turkish Cup. The winners will earn a berth in the group stage of the 2015–16 UEFA Europa League, and also qualify for the 2015 Turkish Super Cup.

Round and draw dates

Preliminary round 
Teams from the Regional Amateur League competed in this round for a place in the first round. All matches were played on 3 September 2014, on the first team's home ground.

|-

|}

First round 
All matches were played on 10 September 2014 on the first team's home ground. The winners advanced to the second round.

|-

|}

Second round 
All matches were played on 23–25 September 2014 on the first team's home ground. The winners advanced to the third round.

|-

|}

Third round 
All matches were played from 28 October 2014 to 5 November 2014 on the first team's home ground. The winners advanced to the group stage.

|-

|}

Group stage
The top five teams from the 2013–14 Süper Lig joined the 27 winners from the third round for the group stage. The group draw commenced on 7 November 2014, as 32 teams were split into eight groups of four. This stage was a round-robin tournament with home and away matches, in the vein of UEFA European competitions' group stages. Group stage matches began on 2 December 2014 and concluded on 5 February 2015. The winners and runners-up of the two groups advanced to the round of 16.

Group A

Group B

Group C

Group D

Group E

Group F

Group G

Group H

Bracket

Round of 16
Group winners and runners-up faced each other in the round of 16. All matches were played from 10 to 12 February 2015. One-legged matches were played in the group winners' home ground. Extra time and a penalty shoot-out would commence if the score was level at the end of 90 minutes.

Quarter-finals
The winners of the round of 16 matches were drawn against each other via a seeding system based on their previous seasons' league performances. The quarter-finals were played in two-legged matches.

First leg

Second leg

Semi-finals
The semi-finals were played in two-legged matches. All teams remaining in competition were Süper Lig teams, playing in the top flight of Turkish football league system.

First leg

Second leg

Final
The final was contested in Bursa as a one-off match. The winners were awarded fifty medals per club along with the Turkish Cup trophy.

See also 
 2014–15 Süper Lig
 2014–15 TFF First League
 2014–15 TFF Second League
 2014–15 TFF Third League

References

External links 

2014-15
Turkish Cup
Cup